t Fornuis is a restaurant located in the Reynderstraat in Antwerp, Belgium. It is a quality restaurant that has been awarded one Michelin star from 1986 to present. Gault Millau gave them 17 out of 20 points.

The kitchen style is classic French and classic Belgian.

The head chef believes in working with fresh products. That means that there is no traditional menu, but a blackboard with that day's specials. These specials depend on the daily deliveries and the season.

References

External links

Michelin Guide starred restaurants in Belgium
Restaurants in Belgium
Companies based in Antwerp